The Honorable Belinda J. Foster is the first African American woman District Attorney in North Carolina. Foster is a graduate of Bennett College located in Greensboro, North Carolina, in 1979. 
In 1985 she graduated from the University North Carolina School of Law. She is currently a private citizen.

African-American women lawyers
African-American lawyers
American women lawyers
District attorneys in North Carolina
Bennett College alumni
University of North Carolina School of Law alumni
Living people
Place of birth missing (living people)
Year of birth missing (living people)
21st-century African-American people
21st-century African-American women